Accommodationism is a judicial interpretation with respect to Church and state issues.

Accommodationism may also refer to:
 Atlanta Compromise, an agreement struck in 1895 between African-American leaders and Southern white leaders
 A term coined by Austin Dacey (born 1972) to describe those “who either recognize no conflicts between religion and science, or who recognize such conflicts but are disinclined to discuss them publicly”

See also 
 Accommodation (disambiguation)